The Main Street Bridge, officially the John T. Alsop Jr. Bridge, is a bridge crossing the St. Johns River in Jacksonville, Florida. It was the second bridge built across the river. It carries four lanes of traffic, and is signed as US 1/US 90 (SR 5/SR 10). A lift bridge, it opened in July 1941 at a cost of $1.5 million. In 1957 it was named after Mayor John T. Alsop Jr., but continues to be known, even on road signs, as the Main Street Bridge. It remains one of the most recognizable features of the Downtown Jacksonville skyline.

History
Construction of the Main Street Bridge began in 1938 at a cost of $1.5 million by the Mount Vernon Bridge Company. It was a War Department permitted in 1936 prior to World War II. The Main Street Bridge took three years to be built and had a dedication ceremony on July 17, 1941. The bridge was built as a vertical lift bridge with use of trusses in order to lift up to accommodate ships passing underneath it. The official name of the bridge, John T. Alsop Jr. Bridge, was dedicated in 1957 to former mayor of Jacksonville John T. Alsop. The bridge carries traffic to and from San Marco, Southbank, Downtown Jacksonville and Interstate 95. In 2014 the Main Street Bridge underwent an $11 million renovation to upgrade metal barriers and patch sidewalks.

With other nearby bridges having been rebuilt as fixed spans by around the end of the 20th century, the Main Street Bride is now the only remaining moveable bridge carrying automobile traffic across the St. Johns river in the Jacksonville area. Of the eight vehicle crossings in the region, four (Shands, Fuller Warren, Acosta and Main St.) had included movable spans when they initially opened.

Gallery

The bridge opens at half past the hour.

References

External links

Bridges in Jacksonville, Florida
Bridges over the St. Johns River
Downtown Jacksonville
Vertical lift bridges in the United States
Truss bridges in the United States
Bridges completed in 1941
Road bridges in Florida
Bridges of the United States Numbered Highway System
U.S. Route 1
U.S. Route 90
Architecture in Jacksonville, Florida
Towers in Florida
1941 establishments in Florida
Steel bridges in the United States